Hryhoriy Vul is a Soviet midfielder and coach from Ukraine.

External links
 Died Hryhoriy Vul, a ledend of Metalurh Zaporizhia on football.zp.ua
 Passed away: Hryhoriy Vul on football.ua
 Hryhoriy Vul on footballfacts.ru

1937 births
2013 deaths
People from Horlivka
Soviet footballers
Ukrainian footballers
FC Metalurh Zaporizhzhia players
Ukrainian football managers
FC Metalurh Zaporizhzhia managers
FC Torpedo Zaporizhzhia managers
Ukrainian Premier League managers
Association footballers not categorized by position
Sportspeople from Donetsk Oblast